Greg McGhee (born November 22, 1992) is an American football quarterback who is currently a free agent. He played college football at Howard University and attended Perry Traditional Academy in Pittsburgh, Pennsylvania. He has also been a member of the BC Lions, Montreal Alouettes, Green Bay Blizzard and Toronto Argonauts.

Early life
McGhee attended Perry Traditional Academy in Pittsburgh, Pennsylvania where he was a member of both the football and basketball teams.

College career
Heading into his senior season, McGhee was voted preseason Mid-Eastern Athletic Conference Offensive Player of the Year. McGhee was named Co-MEAC Offensive Player of the Year at the conclusion of the season, sharing the title with Tarik Cohen.

Professional career

BC Lions
On February 19, 2015, McGhee signed with the BC Lions of the Canadian Football League. On June 18, 2016, McGhee was cut.

Montreal Alouettes
McGhee signed with the Montreal Alouettes prior to the 2017 season, but he did not make the team's roster.

Green Bay Blizzard
On May 18, 2017, McGhee signed with the Green Bay Blizzard. McGhee threw for 433 yards and 6 touchdowns in 4 games with the Blizzard.

Philadelphia Soul
Prior to the start of the 2018 season, McGhee was assigned to the Philadelphia Soul. After not playing the first 6 weeks, McGhee was thrust into action when Dan Raudabaugh left the Soul's May 19 game against the Albany Empire. McGhee threw two touchdown passes, but the Soul lost to the Empire 41–36.

Toronto Argonauts
McGhee signed with the Toronto Argonauts in the 2018 season.

Columbus Destroyers
On March 5, 2019, McGhee was assigned to the Columbus Destroyers. On April 13, 2019, he was placed on recallable reassignment and became a free agent.

References

External links
Howard Bison profile
Greg McGhee, argonauts.ca

Living people
1992 births
Players of American football from Pittsburgh
Players of Canadian football from Pittsburgh
American football quarterbacks
Canadian football quarterbacks
American players of Canadian football
Howard Bison football players
BC Lions players
Montreal Alouettes players
Green Bay Blizzard players
Philadelphia Soul players
Toronto Argonauts players
Columbus Destroyers players